The greater stick-nest rat, also known as the house-building rat and wopilkara (Leporillus conditor) is a species of rodent in the family Muridae. They are about the size of a small rabbit and construct large nests of interwoven sticks. Once widespread across southern Australia, the population was reduced after European colonisation to a remnant outpost on South Australia's Franklin Islands. The species has since been reintroduced to a series of protected and monitored areas, with varying levels of success.

Taxonomy 
A description of the species was given in a report of the explorer Charles Sturt, and published in 1848. The species was placed as genus Mus, and later assigned to Leporillus, and so allied to the murid family of rodents.
The type was collected in vegetation on the Darling River, around 45 miles from Laidley Ponds, the disposition of this specimen is unknown.

Description
The species has a broad and short head, with wide and rounded ears. The length of the head and body combined in 190 to 260 millimetres, and a tail noticeably shorter than that, measuring from 148 to 180 mm. The weight ranges from 190 to 450 grams. The pelage is a uniform grey-brown colour at the upper-side, the buff to grey beneath is paler and the two colours blend where they meet. The visible parts of the foot are whitish at the inside and greyish brown at the outside, this is from 42 to 48 mm in length.
The female possesses four teats, two pairs at the inguinal region.

Behaviour 
The behavioural description is of a passive and gentle species, largely active at night, with a herbivorous diet largely composed of succulent leaves. The 'nest' of L. conditor is sited at a cave, rocky outcrop or over a shrub, the construction reaching a metre in height and around two metres in width. The larger part of the nest is tightly woven from sticks, the inner part is built from softer grassy material.

Ownership of nests appears typically to be passed down through relatively sedentary, genetically-related female lines, with males typically distributing throughout the landscape at sexual maturity.

Mainland populations were reported in historical accounts to prefer building nests over slight depressions in the ground or above the burrows of other animals, which were used as escape routes. Some animals were known to weight their nests with small rocks. Nests were reported to be strong and secure enough to repel dingos and other predators.

Breeding may occur throughout the year, although most often recorded during the austral spring, April to May, and they produce a litter of between one and four young.

Distribution and habitat
The species' natural habitat is dry savanna, with perennial shrubland, especially of succulent and semi-succulent plant species including the chenopod and pig-face genera.

It was formerly widespread in semi-arid habitat on the mainland, where the soils were shallow with calcareous underlying strata.
Before the sharp decline in population in the late nineteenth century, the species was found south of a line from Shark Bay to the meeting of the rivers at the Murray–Darling basin and above the 28° southern latitude. 

The drastic reduction in the range of this mammal is associated with the collapse of mammalian fauna in Australia between about 1875 and 1925, which is often linked to the decline of aboriginal land management and burning practices, widespread land clearance and agriculture, the introduction of foreign grazing animals including sheep, cattle and rabbits, and invasions by exotic predators like the European red fox and feral cats.  The susceptibility of this species to a theorised epizootic event, an unidentified disease spreading from Western Australia, was estimated to be high in modelling of mammal's relative immunity.

The drastic contraction of the distribution range continued until the species could only be found on the Franklin Islands in the Nuyts Archipelago, and from this population the species was reintroduced to protected areas on the mainland and other islands. There are now introduced or reintroduced populations on St Peter Island in the Nuyts Archipelago, Reevesby Island, Salutation Island, and at Arid Recovery, a fenced reserve at Roxby Downs in South Australia.

The longterm success of a series of translocations to the fenced Mount Gibson Sanctuary in Western Australia is as yet undetermined, while reintroduction attempts began at a fenced landscape within NSW's Mallee Cliffs National Park in September 2020. The species was reintroduced to Dirk Hartog Island in May 2021, with early monitoring suggesting ongoing survival.

Only 40 per cent of reintroduction attempts for the species have been considered successful. Attempts to reintroduce the species failed at Faure Island and Heirisson Prong in Western Australia, at Yookamurra Sanctuary and Venus Bay Conservation Park in South Australia, and at Scotia Sanctuary in NSW. Most failures were blamed on inadequate habitat or release protocols, or excessive predation. 

The species is scheduled be translocated to a fenced landscape in NSW's Sturt National Park.

It is currently being bred in captivity at Monarto Safari Park and Adelaide Zoo, with progeny provided to reintroduction projects.

References

Leporillus
Mammals of Western Australia
Endangered fauna of Australia
Extinct mammals of South Australia
Mammals of New South Wales
Rodents of Australia
Mammals described in 1848
Taxonomy articles created by Polbot